Fernando Tarrida del Mármol (August 2, 1861 – 1915) was a mathematics professor born in Cuba and raised in Catalonia best known for proposing "anarchism without adjectives", the idea that anarchists should set aside their debates over the most preferable economic systems and acknowledge their commonality in ultimate aims.

Early life and career 

Fernando Tarrida del Mármol was born in 1861 in Cuba. His family emigrated to Spain during the 1868 Glorious Revolution, and his father ran a shoe and boot manufacturing plant in the Catalonian town of Sitges. Tarrida received a degree in mathematics from the Pau lycée, in southern France. His classmate and later French prime minister Louis Barthou converted him to republicanism. Tarrida moved to the University of Barcelona for a degree in civil engineering, and became a professor of mathematics at Barcelona's Polytechnic.

Despite his family's wealth, he identified more closely with Barcelona's working class and visited their clubs to discuss politics and quality of life. The workers appreciated his charisma and sincerity. By the mid 1880s—Tarrida's twenties—he was a collectivist anarchist who identified with the federalism of Pierre-Joseph Proudhon and Francesc Pi i Margall. Tarrida viewed anarchism beyond political philosophy as an all-encompassing philosophy, or the process by which humanity integrates and develops. He often referred to anarchism in mathematical formula as both the language to clarify his thoughts and to scientifically prove the philosophy's tenets. Tarrida gave public lectures and wrote about anarchism for libertarian journals, and developed a friendship with the Spanish anarchist Anselmo Lorenzo. Barcelona workers chose Tarrida as their delegate to the International Socialist Congress in Paris, 1889.

Tarrida first proposed the idea of "anarchism without adjectives" during a public speech in November 1889. Anarchists often debated their ideal economic conditions, and "anarchism without adjectives" appealed anarchists to abandon these divisions, accommodate other factions, follow the basic principles of anarchism, and instead work together towards their unified cause. He argued that anarchists share opposition to dogma and should therefore let each other freely choose their choice of economic system. Put another way, anarchism was "the axiom" and their economic model was "secondary". Tarrida gave this speech at the Bellas Artes palace as a representative of an affinity group in commemoration of the Chicago Haymarket affair two years prior. Tarrida, himself, did not publicly engage in the factionism between collectivism and communism, though his earlier works adopted a collectivist position. In 1890, the French anarcho-communist journal Le Révolté charged the Spanish anarchist movement as overly collectivist and prone to authoritarian organization. The journal challenged Tarrida to defend his position, and in an open letter, he affirmed their differences in tactics but agreement in ultimate goal. He defended the Spanish anarchist model of forming alliances between groups, and criticized the French anarchists' puritanical rigidity as ineffectual against the centralized bourgeoisie in the absence of coordinated action. Tarrida also noted the difference between the development of Spanish and French anarchism. While the French called the Spanish workers' associations authoritarian, Tarrida wrote that these organizations were responsible for building the anarchist tradition in Spain and contributed to their workers' natural rejection of communist worker models.

Tarrida was held during the 1896 Montjuïc trial, in which the Spanish government oversaw the torture of Spanish anarchists and laborers. Deported at its conclusion, Tarrida wrote Les inquisiteurs d’Espagne (Montjuich, Cuba, Philippines), which was influential in spreading news of the Montjuïc events and Spanish association with barbarism widely.

References

Bibliography

Further reading 

 Abelló Güell, Teresa. Les relacions internacionals de l’anarquisme català (1881-1914). Barcelona: Edicions 62, 1987.
 Abelló Güell, Teresa. «Tarrida del Mármol, Fernando», en: M. Teresa Martínez de Sas i Pelai Pagès (coord.), Diccionari biogràfic del moviment obrer als Països Catalans. Barcelona: Universitat de Barcelona / Publicacions de l'Abadia de Montserrat, 2000.
 Abelló Güell, Teresa. «Fernando Tarrida del Mármol. Anarquisme i cosmopolitisme a finals del segle XIX», en Butlletí de la Societat Catalana d'Estudis Històrics, núm. XXVII (2016), p. 131-144.
 Dalmau Ribalta, Antoni. Per la causa dels humils. Una biografia de Tarrida del Mármol (1861-1915). Barcelona: Publicacions de l'Abadia de Montserrat, 2015.
 Dalmau Ribalta, Antoni. El procés de Montjuïc. Barcelona al final del segle XIX. Barcelona: Ajuntament/Editorial Base, 2010.
 Dalmau Ribalta, Antoni. «Tarrida del Mármol. Una evocació», en L’Avenç, núm. 370, juliol-agost de 2011, p. 38-44.
 Dalmau Ribalta, Antoni. «L’anarquisme en el tombant dels segles XIX i XX: l’acció de Tarrida del Mármol», en Butlletí de la Societat Catalana d’Estudis Històrics, núm. XXIV (2013), p. 19-31.

External links 

 Works by Tarrida

1861 births
1915 deaths
People from Havana
Anarchist writers
Anarchists without adjectives
Cuban anarchists
Cuban people of Catalan descent
Cuban emigrants to England
Spanish anarchists